is the tenth solo album by Susumu Hirasawa. The album's name is taken from the Bạch Hổ or White Tiger oil field in Vietnam. 

Two of its songs were featured in the 2006 anime film Paprika.

Track listing

"Parade" contains samples of "Nurse Cafe" (by Susumu Hirasawa, from the album Siren) and "Monster a Go Go" (by P-Model, from the box set Ashu-on [Sound Subspecies] in the solar system).

Personnel
Susumu Hirasawa - Vocals, Electric guitar (TALBO Secret FACTORY ICE-9), Electronic keyboard (Roland A-37), Amiga, Personal computer, Digital audio workstation (Cakewalk Sonar), Synthesizers (EASTWEST Symphonic Orchestra, EASTWEST Symphonic Choirs), Vocaloid (Lola, Miriam, Meiko), Sampler (NATIVE INSTRUNENTS Kontakt), Sequencer (Bars'n'Pipes), Programming, Production
Nguyen Ngoc Hoa (BOUGAIN VILLAEA) - Voice on "Byakkoya - White Tiger Field"
Masanori Chinzei - Recording, Mixing, Mastering
Syotaro Takami - Translation
Toshifumi "non graph" Nakai - Design
Presented by CHAOS UNION/TESLAKITE LABEL: Kenji Sato, Rihito Yumoto and Mika Hirano

References

External links
 Byakkoya - White Tiger Field
 "The Girl in Byakkoya - White Tiger Field" music video

2006 albums
Susumu Hirasawa albums